The Anchorage Northern Knights were a professional basketball team based in Anchorage, Alaska from 1977 to 1982. The team played in the Eastern Basketball Association (EBA) during the 1977–78 season. The next season, the league changed its name to the Continental Basketball Association (CBA). The Northern Knights were their division champions two years in a row (1979–1980) and won the 1980 CBA Finals. Throughout their history, the Northern Knights played their home games at West Anchorage High School Gymnasium.

History
When the Northern Knights joined the league, then known as the Eastern Basketball Association (EBA), it attracted national attention for being perhaps the most misplaced franchise in the history of professional sports. Playing in Anchorage, Alaska, the team was 5,000 miles away from its nearest competitor, as all the other teams were based in the eastern Pennsylvania–New York–New Jersey area. League officials "began to see the publicity value a team in Alaska would have for the EBA, which, with an enlarged talent pool since the ABA folded, had been trying to upgrade its image from that of a nickel-and-dime Pennsylvania mill-town circuit—which is mostly what it had been—to something on the order of baseball's Triple-A leagues," John Papnek in Sports Illustrated.

During the team's first two seasons, the Knights began their regular schedule with an extended homestand; then endured a mid-season bus trip to every CBA team in the league; then finished out the season with another homestand. The Northern Knights had the longest recorded road trip in professional sports history during the 1979–1980 season as the team traveled by bus around the contiguous United States—playing 16 games in 31 days.

The Knights experienced success in the 1977–78 season, leading the league in attendance and often playing before sellout crowds.  They won the Western Division with a 24–7 record in 1977-78. The team advanced to the CBA Finals the following year, where they were swept in four games by the Rochester Zeniths, with whom they had begun to develop an impassioned rivalry. In 1979-80, the Northern Knights captured the CBA Championship by defeating Rochester in seven games. It was the first professional sports championship won by an Alaskan team. 

Brad Davis played for the Northern Knights in the 1978–79 and 1979–80 seasons, capturing the CBA Newcomer of the Year Award in 1978–79. Davis then embarked on a long NBA career, highlighted by twelve seasons with the NBA's Dallas Mavericks, where he became the first player to have his jersey number retired by the NBA franchise. Ron Davis was a two-time CBA scoring leader; in 1979–80, he was CBA Most Valuable Player for the Anchorage squad.

Notable Northern Knights players included Freeman Blade, Tico Brown, Steve Hawes, Arvid Kramer, Steve Hayes, Brad Branson, and Al Fleming. The Knights were coached by Bill Klucas, who won the 1980 CBA Coach of the Year award. Dick Lobdell, who was the voice of the Alaska Baseball League, served as the Northern Knights play-by-play commentator.

Season-by-season standings
Key

Table

All-time roster

Nate Barnett
Norton Barnhill
Greg Bell
Freeman Blade
Brad Branson
Tico Brown
Roger Burkman
James Cornelious
Brad Davis
Harry Davis
Melvin Davis
Ron Davis
Paul Dawkins
Craig Finberg
Pat Flanigin
Al Fleming
Lucious Foster
Tony Fuller
Curt Gilstrap
Jerome Gladney
James Hardy
Herman Harris
Steve Hayes
Tony Jackson
Roy Jones
Clarence Kea
Andre Keys
Rob King
Larry Knight
Arvid Kramer
Edmund Lawrence
Rickey Lee
Jim Perryman
Keith McCord
Dick Miller
Purvis Miller
Charles Mitchell
Ron Moore
Alex Oliveira
Stan Pietkiewicz
John Ramsay
Clarence Ruffen
John Smith
Dean Tolson
Tony Turner
Jeff Tyson
Bernard Vaughan
Slick Watts
Dave Wear
Tom Wheeler
Connie White
Rudy White

Sources

References

External links
1977-1982 Anchorage Northern Knights via FunWhileitLasted.com

Basketball teams in Alaska
Continental Basketball Association teams
Defunct basketball teams in the United States
Basketball teams established in 1977
Sports clubs disestablished in 1982
Sports in Anchorage, Alaska
Defunct sports teams in Alaska